Kenneth "Ken" Morgan Golden is an American applied mathematician and Distinguished Professor at the University of Utah. He is recognized as the "Indiana Jones of Mathematics" for his work in polar climate modeling and has traveled to the polar regions eighteen times, in total, to study sea ice.

Biography
Golden first became interested in sea ice in his senior year of high school while working on a project studying passive microwave images of Antarctic sea ice at NASA Goddard Space Flight Center. He enrolled in Dartmouth College so that he could work at the Cold Regions Research and Engineering Laboratory with Stephen F. Ackley. He graduated from Dartmouth in 1980 with his bachelor's degree in mathematics and physics, and enrolled in the PhD program at the NYU Courant Institute of Mathematical Sciences. He received his PhD in 1984 and then worked as a National Science Foundation Postdoctoral Fellow in mathematical physics at Rutgers University and as an assistant professor of mathematics at Princeton University. He joined the Department of Mathematics at the University of Utah in 1991.
In 2012 he became one of the inaugural fellows of the American Mathematical Society. Golden's research focuses on modeling sea ice and its role in the climate system using theories of composite materials and statistical physics.

References

Living people
Applied mathematicians
American climatologists
Dartmouth College alumni
Courant Institute of Mathematical Sciences alumni
Princeton University faculty
University of Utah faculty
Fellows of the Society for Industrial and Applied Mathematics
Fellows of the American Mathematical Society
American polar explorers
Explorers of Antarctica
Fellows of the Explorers Club
Year of birth missing (living people)